Kluisbergen is a municipality located in the Belgian province of East Flanders, along the Scheldt river. In 2021, Kluisbergen had a total population of 6,682. The total area is 30.38 km². The town of Ruien is the largest and has some outdoor facilities. Kluisbergen is also home to the "Kluisbos", a forest which has 2 ancient standing stones, dating back to Roman times.

Geography
Kluisbergen consists of four towns:
Neighbouring towns/municipalities:

Map

Landscape 
The Scheldt makes up the northwestern border of Kluisbergen where the landscape is rather flat. Traveling south or southeast is met with an increasing moderately hilly landscape all the way to the southern border

There are three main hills in Kluisbergen. The Kluisberg is mainly located on the border of Ruien and Orroir, stretching all the way to Kwaremont. The Paterberg is located in the middle of Kwaremont. The Hotondberg is located on the border of Zulzeke and Ronse and is the highest point of East Flanders. The three hills are the westernmost hills of the Flemish Ardennes.

Tourism
Flemish Ardennes are known for their steep hills with several of them having forests on their hillsides. Kluisbergen is no exception and is best known for these hills. Their important role in the Tour of Flanders make them popular among cyclists. The municipality incorporates its many field trails in hiking routes with hiking tours are also being organized.

Kwaremont has the title of "Artist Village" because of its numerous painters and art galleries.

References

External links

Official website 

 
Municipalities of East Flanders
Populated places in East Flanders